Slătioara is a commune located in Vâlcea County, Oltenia, Romania. It is composed of six villages: Coasta Cerbului, Gorunești, Milostea, Mogești, Rugetu, and Slătioara.

Natives
 Dinu Săraru

References

Communes in Vâlcea County
Localities in Oltenia